The Faculty of Tourism and Food of the Dublin Institute of Technology (DIT) is located at Cathal Brugha Street in Dublin.

History
Originally opened as the College of Catering in 1941, The Faculty of Tourism and Food was founded in 1992.

The faculty specialised in training professional chefs, hospitality managers, and other professionals in the food and tourism industry, providing undergraduate degrees as well as master's degrees and doctorates.

Its graduates include Darina Allen, TV chef, food writer, and founder of the Michelin starred Ballymaloe House and Cookery School and food company, along with several other noted Irish chefs and hoteliers.

In a restructuring of the faculty in 2009, the School of Hospitality Management and Tourism and the School of Culinary Arts were merged with the former Faculty of Applied Arts into the new College of Arts and Tourism. The School of Food Science and Environmental Health was transferred to the new College of Science.

Schools
The former Faculty of Tourism and Food consists of the following Schools

 School of Hospitality Management and Tourism
 School of Food Science and Environmental Health
 School of Culinary Arts and Food Technology

External links
Faculty of Tourism and Food Site

References

F